Judson is both a surname and a masculine given name. It is a patronymic derived from the first name "Judd" or "Jutt", a hypocorism for "Jordan".

Notable people with the name include:

Surname 

Adoniram Judson (1788–1850), the first American missionary abroad
Alice Judson (1876–1948), American painter
Andrew T. Judson (1784–1853), Connecticut politician
Ann Hasseltine Judson (1789–1826), America's first female Baptist foreign missionary
Arthur Judson (1881–1975), American orchestra manager, artists' manager
Edward Judson (1844–1914), American Baptist clergyman
Edward Zane Carroll Judson, Sr. aka Ned Buntline (1821–1886), American publisher, journalist, writer and publicist
Harry Pratt Judson (1849–1927)
Horace Freeland Judson (1931–2011), historian of molecular biology
Howie Judson (1925–2020), American baseball player
Joseph Judson (1619–1690), Connecticut settler, local official and militia officer
Margaret Atwood Judson (1899–1991), American historian
Margaret Judson (born 1987), American actress
Olivia Judson (born 1970), evolutionary biologist and science writer
Pieter Judson (born 1956), American historian
Thomas Judson (1857–1908), Wales international rugby player
Whitcomb L. Judson (1846–1909), invented the zip fastener
Pothuraju Judson, Indian entomologist

Given name 

Judson Birza (born 1989), television personality and contestant on Survivor: Nicaragua
Judson Canfield (1759–1840), American politician and judge
Judson Leroy Day (1877-1944), American dentist and politician
Judson Flint (born 1957), American football player
Judson Hall (1855–1938), American politician
Judson G. Hart, American politician
Judson Hill (born 1959), American politician
Judson Laipply (born 1976), motivational speaker and comedian best known through YouTube
Judson LaMoure, (1839–1918), American politician
Judson Pratt (1916–2002), American film, television and theatre actor
Judson Prentice (1810–1886), American politician
Judson (footballer, born 1992) (born 1992), Brazilian-Equatoguinean footballer
Judson (footballer, born 1993) (born 1993), Brazilian footballer

References

Masculine given names